Autingues is a commune in the Pas-de-Calais department in northern France.

Geography
A village located 10 miles (16 km) southeast of Calais, at the junction of the D225 with the D227 road.

Population

Sights
 The eighteenth-century church of St. Louis.
 The eighteenth-century château.

See also
Communes of the Pas-de-Calais department

References

Communes of Pas-de-Calais